Jelko Kacin (born 26 November 1955) is a Slovenian politician.

During the Slovenian Independence War, he was the Secretary of Information of Slovenia. He founded the Slovenian Press Agency on 3 June 1991 and the war (also called the Ten-Day War) started on 27 June 1991. He is the former president of the Liberal Democracy of Slovenia and member of the bureau of the Alliance of Liberals and Democrats for Europe, who sat on the European Parliament's Committee on Foreign Affairs.

A former Member of the European Parliament, Kacin was also a substitute for the Committee on Transport and Tourism, vice-chair of the delegation to the EU–Moldova Parliamentary Cooperation Committee, a substitute for the delegation to the former Yugoslav Republic of Macedonia–EU Joint Parliamentary Committee, and for the delegations for relations with Iran, the Korean Peninsula, and the countries of south-east Europe.

Career
 1980: Defence studies graduate, University of Ljubljana
 1980: Trainee in the Municipality of Kranj
 1981: Adviser on defence preparations in the Municipality of Kranj
 1984: Adviser on defence training in the Municipality of Kranj
 1988: Head of the municipal civil protection unit
 1990: Deputy Republican Defence Secretary
 1991: Republican Secretary/Minister for Information
 1993: Defence Minister
 1993: Marketing division, Adria Karavan, Novo mesto
 1996: Member of the LDS council
 1996: Chairman of the Foreign Relations Committee
 1996: Member of the Defence Committee and the Constitutional Commission
 2000: Member of the Slovenian delegation to the Parliamentary Assembly of the Council of Europe
 2000: Member of the EU-Slovenia Joint Parliamentary Committee
 2000: Head of the national delegation to the IPU
 2000: Member of the National Assembly of Slovenia
 2000: Chairman of the Foreign Policy Committee
 2000: Member of the Defence Committee and the European Affairs Commission
 2002: Member of Kranj Municipal Council (1998)
 2003: Observer in the European Parliament
 2003: Member of the Convention on the Future of Europe
 2003: Chairman of the LDS regional committee for Gorenjska
 2003: Chairman of the Kranj committee of the LDS
 2004: Member of the ALDE Bureau
 2005: President of LDS

External links
 
 

1955 births
Living people
Politicians from Celje
Slovenian Democratic Union politicians
Liberal Democracy of Slovenia politicians
University of Ljubljana alumni
Defence ministers of Slovenia
Liberal Democracy of Slovenia MEPs
MEPs for Slovenia 2004–2009
MEPs for Slovenia 2009–2014
Democratic Party of Slovenia politicians

Slovenian people of Croatian descent